Roseanne is an American television sitcom that aired from 1988 to 1997.

Roseanne may also refer to:

 Roseanne (name), a female given name
 Roseanne Barr (born 1952), an American actress, comedian and producer eponymous to the sitcom series
 The Roseanne Show, an American talk show hosted by the actress that aired from 1998 to 2000
 The Real Roseanne Show, an American reality show surrounding the actress that aired in 2003
 Roseanne's Nuts, an American reality show surrounding the actress that aired in 2011